Víctor Martínez (born July 29, 1973) is a retired  International Federation of BodyBuilders (IFBB) professional bodybuilder, and the second Dominican bodybuilder to turn professional (the first being Tony Domenench from Puerto Plata, who turned pro in 1995). His career highlights were winning the Arnold Classic in 2007 and finishing runner-up at the 2007 Mr. Olympia. He signed a contract for a sponsorship deal with Maximum Human Performance which also sponsors Michael Kefalianos.

Biography
Martínez's career was launched when he competed in the 1997 National Physique Committee (NPC) New York Metro Championships as a light heavyweight, where he placed first. He continued competing in NPC tournaments until 2001, where he competed in his first IFBB tournament, the Night of Champions, where he placed 8th. The following year, in 2002, he competed in his first Arnold Classic, and placed 13th. He also competed in his first Ironman Pro Invitational the same year, placing 9th. In 2003 he went on to win the Night of Champions.

His first Mr. Olympia came in 2004, where he placed 9th, but he advanced to 5th place in 2005, 3rd place in 2006, and 2nd place in 2007 In 2005 Ronnie Coleman predicted that Martínez would be his successor as Mr. Olympia, although this position was held by Jay Cutler (2006, 2007), then Dexter Jackson (2008).

In 2007, Martínez took first at the Arnold Classic. Martínez later finished second to Jay Cutler at the 2007 Mr. Olympia contest.

In January 2008, Martínez underwent surgery to repair his left patellar tendon which ruptured while he was performing warm-up lunges. Due to the severity of the injury, he was unable to compete in either the 2008 Arnold Classic or 2008 Mr. Olympia contests.
After almost a year away from training and competition, Victor Martinez resumed training with his old friend and strength & condition coach Jakob Panotas. During their 9 months of hardcore training and rehabbing his knee, he came strong and placed 2nd at 2009 Arnold Classic in Columbus Ohio by only 2-3 points behind 1st place Kai Greene.

In July 2009, Martínez's sister Eridania Rodríguez disappeared from work at a NY skyscraper under mysterious circumstances. Her body was found four days later inside a ventilation shaft on the floor where she was working. Joseph Pabon, a handyman working in the building, was convicted of her murder on April 2, 2012.

In 2018, Víctor Martínez collaborated with the NPC Northeast Ametuer division to create the "Víctor Martínez Legends" championship. Competition classes include:
Men’s Bodybuilding Lightweight
Men’s Bodybuilding Middleweight
Men’s Bodybuilding Light Heavyweight
Men’s Bodybuilding Heavyweight
Women’s Bodybuilding Open Class
Men’s Physique
Men’s Classic Physique
Women’s Physique
Women’s Figure Classes A,B,C
Women’s Bikini Classes A,B,C
Men’s Bodybuilding Novice
Men’s Master Class
Women’s Master Class
Women’s Fitness Teen’s Class

Martínez was co-owner of the Muscle Maker Grill in Edgewater NJ and is the spokesperson for the franchise as a whole. He lost the business due to being incarcerated for more than six weeks for immigration violations. He was arrested on returning to the U.S. on October 9, 2011, after winning the Arnold Europe in Madrid, Spain. His permanent resident card had expired and, due to his criminal record for selling steroids in 2004, it was not renewed. Instead, he was sent to a detention center in New Jersey to await a deportation hearing that could have sent him back to his native Dominican Republic. He was denied bail. A few of the documents were not in order, and his final hearing was postponed until April 2012. He was held at the Hudson County Correctional Facility in South Kearny, New Jersey. On April 27, he returned to court and was released from jail and permitted to remain in the U.S.

Martinez competed in the 2020 Arnold Classic taking 9th place. He announced his retirement soon after at the age of 47. Martinez still holds his sponsorship with MHP. 

Martínez has two sons, Justin and Jared and four daughters, Victoria, Zayde, Vivian and Zoe. 3 of his daughters come from a second marriage.  He resides in Edgewater, New Jersey.

Stats
Height: 1.75 m
Contest weight: 115 kg 
Off-season weight: 125 kg 
Arms: 52 cm 
Chest: 150 cm
Waist: 86 cm 
Thighs: 76 cm
Calves: 48 cm 
Forearms: 40 cm

Contest history

Amateur career
1993 Elmo's Gym, Teenage, 1st
1994 NPC Bev Francis Atlantic States, 27th
1997 NPC New Jersey Suburban State Bodybuilding Contest, Light-Heavyweight, 1st and Overall
1997 NPC New York Metropolitan Championships, Light-Heavyweight, 1st and Overall
1999 NPC Bev Francis Atlantic States, 16th
2000 NPC Junior USA, Heavyweight, 1st
2000 NPC Nationals, Heavyweight, 1st and Overall (pro card)

Pro career
2001 IFBB Night of Champions, 8th
2002 IFBB Arnold Classic, 13th
2002 IFBB Ironman Pro Invitational, 9th
2003 IFBB Night of Champions, 1st
2004 IFBB Mr. Olympia, 9th
2004 IFBB GNC Show of Strength Pro Championship, 1st
2005 IFBB Arnold Classic, 7th
2005 IFBB New York Pro Championship, 3rd
2005 IFBB Mr. Olympia, 5th
2005 IFBB San Francisco Pro Invitational, 5th
2006 IFBB Arnold Classic, 3rd
2006 IFBB Mr. Olympia, 3rd
2007 IFBB Arnold Classic, 1st
2007 IFBB Mr. Olympia, 2nd 
2009 IFBB Arnold Classic, 2nd
2009 IFBB Mr. Olympia, 6th
2010 IFBB Mr. Olympia, 8th
2011 IFBB Arnold Classic, 3rd
2011 IFBB Mr. Olympia, 4th
2011 IFBB Arnold Classic Madrid, 1st
2013 IFBB New York Pro Championship, 2nd
2013 IFBB Toronto Pro Supershow, 1st
2013 IFBB Mr. Olympia, 11th
2013 IFBB Arnold Classic Madrid, 5th
2014 IFBB Tampa Pro, 1st 
2014 IFBB Mr. Olympia, 8th
2014 IFBB Arnold Classic, 4th
2014 IFBB Prague Pro, 7th
2014 IFBB SAN Marino Pro, 4th
2015 IFBB Mr. Olympia, 9th
2015 IFBB New York Pro Championship, 2nd
2016 IFBB Baltimore Pro, 1st
2016 IFBB Mr. Olympia, 11th
2016 IFBB Elite Pro (formerly IFBB) Arnold Classic South Africa, 4th
2017 IFBB Muscle Mayhem, 1st
2017 IFBB Elite Pro (formerly IFBB) Arnold Classic South Africa, 4th
2017 IFBB Arnold Classic Europe, 8th 
2019 IFBB Arnold Classic, 10th
2020 IFBB Arnold Classic, 9th

Sponsorship history
Maximum Human Performance (2005-2020) 
Muscular Development magazine 
Muscle Meds 
Eva’s New York City 
Generation Iron (2020-2021)
Superhero Labs - co owner (2020-2021)
Panatta (2021-present)
Victor Martinez Signature Series - owner (established 2022)

See also
Arnold Classic
List of male professional bodybuilders
Mr. Olympia

References 

1973 births
American bodybuilders
American sportspeople convicted of crimes
Living people
Professional bodybuilders